The 1994 Canisius Golden Griffins football team represented Canisius College in the 1994 NCAA Division I-AA football season. The Golden Griffins offense scored 132 points while the defense allowed 183 points.

Schedule

References

Canisius
Canisius Golden Griffins football seasons
Canisius Golden Griffins football